Gruffudd Gryg (fl. c.1340–1380) was a Welsh poet from Anglesey, North Wales.

A number of Gruffudd's poems have survived including poems to a wave during his pilgrimage to Santiago de Compostela and to an April moon.  Also extant are the debate poems between Gruffudd and his contemporary poet and friend Dafydd ap Gwilym.  He also composed an elegy for Dafydd ap Gwilym and a poem addressed to the yew above his grave..

See also

Gruffudd Gryg at Wikisource

References
 Ifor Williams and Thomas Roberts (eds.), Cywyddau Dafydd ap Gwilym a'i Gyfoeswyr (2nd Edition, Bangor, 1935).
 Thomas Parry (ed.), Gwaith Dafydd ap Gwilym (Caerdydd, 1952, Gwasg Prifysgol Cymru).

14th-century deaths
People from Anglesey
Welsh-language poets
14th-century Welsh poets
Year of birth uncertain